Naval Communication Station Harold E. Holt is a joint Australian and United States naval communication station located on the north-west coast of Australia,  north of the town of Exmouth, Western Australia. The station is operated and maintained by the Australian Department of Defence on behalf of Australia and the United States and provides very low frequency (VLF) radio transmission to United States Navy, Royal Australian Navy and allied ships and submarines in the western Pacific Ocean and eastern Indian Ocean. The frequency is 19.8 kHz. With a transmission power of 1 megawatt, it is the most powerful transmission station in the Southern Hemisphere.

The town of Exmouth was built at the same time as the communications station to provide support to the base and to house dependent families of US Navy personnel.

VLF transmitter masts

The station features thirteen tall radio towers.

On 3 March 2009, the Defence Materiel Organisation advertised on the AusTender website a tender to construct two new roads at the station. The tender stated the 357 guy wires which support the 13 towers had exceeded their life expectancy and the roads will support the installation of the VLF guy wires. It states:

History

Sir Garfield Barwick, Australian Minister for External Affairs, negotiated the lease on the US Base at North West Cape in 1963 with US Ambassador William Battle. The station was commissioned as U.S. Naval Communication Station North West Cape on 16 September 1967 at a ceremony with the US Ambassador to Australia Ed Clark and the Prime Minister of Australia Harold Holt, at which peppercorn rent for the base for the first year was paid.

On 20 September 1968, the station was officially renamed to US Naval Communication Station Harold E. Holt in memory of the late Harold Holt, Prime Minister of Australia, who disappeared whilst swimming and was declared dead, presumed drowned, three months after the station was commissioned.

With the election of the Labor Government to power in 1972, Defence Minister Lance Barnard started negotiations on the condition of operation of the US military bases in Australia. On 9 January 1974 a joint statement by Lance Barnard and James Schlesinger, the US Secretary of Defense, assigned the Deputy Commander of the base to a Royal Australian Navy officer and gave Australian personnel roles in base technical and maintenance functions. The cipher room was closed to Australian scrutiny. The joint statement stressed the importance of consultations in crises. There was no undertaking given by the US to relay fire orders to their submarines bearing nuclear missiles.

In May 1974 several hundred people travelled to North West Cape from around Australia to protest and occupy the base and "symbolically reclaiming it for the Australian people". During the occupation the Eureka Flag was flown over the base with fifty-five people arrested during the protest. Songs composed in the campaign against North West Cape and other US bases in Australia include We don't want no Yankee Bases and Omega Doodle which have become part of the Australian folkloric tradition. From 1967 until October 1992 a USN Naval Security Group Detachment was stationed at the facility.

In Western Australian domestic politics, the presence of foreign military installations in the state has occasionally been questioned over the decades. The "U.S." was dropped from the station's official title with the advent of joint United States and Royal Australian Navy operation in 1974. In 1991, an agreement was reached between the governments of Australia and the United States that would make the facility an Australian Naval Communication Station by 1999, a transition that began with a Royal Australian Navy officer taking command of the facility in 1992. The majority of US Naval presence ended in 1993 with the withdrawal of all US Naval personnel.

In July 2002, the Royal Australian Navy handed over operation of the station to the Defence Materiel Organisation. The base is currently operated under contract by Raytheon Australia. On 15 July 2008, Australia and the US signed a bilateral treaty governing the future joint use of the facility for the next 25 years.

Harold E. Holt was identified as a potential Air Force Space Surveillance System (or Space Fence) site in 2011. On 6 December 2013 it was announced that the Space Surveillance Telescope (SST), part of the United States Space Surveillance Network, will be relocated to the Harold E. Holt Naval Communication Station from its initial deployment at the White Sands Missile Range in New Mexico. The SST is expected to be fully operational in 2022.

A C-Band Space Surveillance Radar is also being installed and once completed will be operated remotely by Royal Australian Air Force personnel from No. 1 Remote Sensor Unit at RAAF Base Edinburgh. It will provide a Space Situational Awareness capability, allowing the tracking of space assets and debris.

Aircraft interference controversy
On 7 October 2008, Qantas Flight 72 made an emergency landing at Learmonth airport near the town of Exmouth, Western Australia following an inflight accident featuring a pair of sudden uncommanded pitch-down manoeuvres that resulted in serious injuries to many of the occupants. The Australian Transport Safety Bureau (ATSB) identified in a preliminary report that a fault occurred within the Number 1 Air Data Inertial Reference Unit (ADIRU) and is the "likely origin of the event". The ADIRUone of three such devices on the aircraftbegan to supply incorrect data to the other aircraft systems. The ATSB assessment of speculation that possible interference from Naval Communication Station Harold E. Holt or passenger personal electronic devices could have been involved was "extremely unlikely".

On 27 December 2008, another aircraft, Qantas Flight 71, also had a malfunction in its ADIRU. The incident again fuelled media speculation regarding the significance of the Harold E. Holt facility, with the Australian and International Pilots Association calling for commercial aircraft to be barred from the area as a precaution until the events are better understood, while the manager of the facility has claimed that it is "highly, highly unlikely" that any interference has been caused.

See also
 VLF Transmitter Cutler
 Jim Creek Naval Radio Station
 Lualualei VLF transmitter
List of masts

References

Further reading

 Barker, E. A.(1985) Brian Burke supports the role of US communications base at NW Cape. West Australian, 25 Nov. 1985, p. 3,
 Communications Station - Shire of Exmouth
 http://www.skyscraperpage.com/diagrams/?b575
 http://www.globalsecurity.org/military/facility/exmouth.htm

External links
 "Google" satellite map: the map opens centered on the "Area A" very low frequency (VLF) towers site, which is at the northernmost edge of the Northwest Cape, approximately 4 miles north of the Main base; the "Area B" high frequency receiver (HFR) site was approximately 30 miles south of the Main Base
 "Google" street view: The view from the side of the road with Tower 9 in the foreground.

Military radio systems
Radio masts and towers
Military installations in Western Australia
Towers in Australia
Science and technology in Western Australia
Shire of Exmouth
Military installations of the United States in Australia
1967 establishments in Australia
Military installations established in 1967